Zip, Zips or ZIP may refer to:

Common uses
 ZIP Code, USPS postal code
 Zipper or zip, clothing fastener

Science and technology

Computing
 ZIP (file format), a compressed archive file format
 zip, a command-line program from Info-ZIP
 Zipping (computer science), or zip, reorganizing lists of lists
 Zip drive, a removable disk storage system
 Zone Information Protocol, AppleTalk protocol
 Zip Chip, Apple II accelerators by Zip Technologies

Other science and technology
 Zip tone, in telephony
 Zig-zag in-line package, electronic packaging
 Zip fuel, a type of jet fuel
 Zip tie, a cable fastener
 Zrt- and Irt-like proteins, or Zips, zinc transporters

Arts, entertainment and media
 Zip (game), a children's game
 Zip (roller coaster), at Oaks Amusement Park, Oregon, US
 Zip, a band formed by Pete Shelley
 Zip Comics, 1940-1944
 ZIP FM, a radio station, Vilnius, Lithuania
 ZIP Magazine, UK
 Zip, a character in the Tomb Raider video games
 Zip, a vertical line in Barnett Newman's paintings

Film and television
 Zip (TUGS), a character in the British children's television series TUGS
 title character of Zip, the Dodger, a 1914 film starring Fatty Arbuckle
 ZIP, a fictional amnestic drug in the Blindspot TV series

Brands, enterprises and products
 Zip (airline), a former Canadian airline
 Mr. ZIP, a promotional character
 Piaggio Zip, a scooter
 Zip Co, an Australian fintech company
 Zip Industries, an Australian manufacturer of hot water dispensers
 Zip's Drive-in, an American restaurant chain
 Zip.ca, a Canadian DVD rental service
 Zip card, for travel in London, UK
 Zip cube, firelighters

Places
 Žíp, a village in Slovakia
 Spiš or Zips, Slovakia
 Zip City, Alabama, US

People
 Zip Collins (1892–1983), American baseball player
 John Connolly (FBI) (born 1940), nicknamed "Zip"
 Zip Hanna (1916–2001), American football player
 Zip Zabel (1891–1970), American baseball player
 Bohdan Zip (1929–2017), Canadian politician
 Zip the Pinhead, American freak show performer William Henry Johnson (c. 1857–1926)
 a ring name of Tom Prichard (born 1959), American retired professional wrestler

Other uses
 Zip, slang for zero
 Zips, a derogatory term used by Italian-American mobsters for newer immigrant Sicilian and Italian mafiosi
 Akron Zips, the University of Akron athletic teams
 Zip Feed Tower, a former grain elevator in Sioux Falls, South Dakota, US

See also
 Zip gun (disambiguation)
 "Zip, Zip, Zip", an episode of the TV series How I Met Your Mother
 Zipp (disambiguation)
 Zipper (disambiguation)
 Zippy (disambiguation)
 
 

Lists of people by nickname